Tensegrity, tensional integrity or floating compression is a structural principle based on a system of isolated components under compression inside a network of continuous tension, and arranged in such a way that the compressed members (usually bars or struts) do not touch each other while the prestressed tensioned members (usually cables or tendons) delineate the system spatially.

The term was coined by Buckminster Fuller in the 1960s as a portmanteau of "tensional integrity". The other denomination of tensegrity, floating compression, was used mainly by the constructivist artist Kenneth Snelson.

Concept 

Tensegrity structures are based on the combination of a few simple design patterns:
 members loaded in either pure compression or pure tension, which means that the structure will only fail if the cables yield or the rods buckle. This enables the material properties and cross-sectional geometry of each member to be optimized to the particular load it carries.
 preload or tensional prestress allows cables to always be in tension, to maintain structural integrity.
 mechanical stability, which allows the members to remain in tension/compression as stress on the structure increases. The structure also becomes stiffer as cable tension increases.

Because of these patterns, no structural member experiences a bending moment and there are no shear stresses within the system. This can produce exceptionally strong and rigid structures for their mass and for the cross section of the components. The loading of at least some tensegrity structures causes an auxetic response and negative Poisson ratio, e.g. the T3-prism and 6-strut tensegrity icosahedron.

A conceptual building block of tensegrity is seen in the 1951 Skylon. Six cables, three at each end, hold the tower in position. The three cables connected to the bottom "define" its location. The other three cables are simply keeping it vertical.

A three-rod tensegrity structure (shown to the right) builds on this simpler structure: the ends of each green rod look like the top and bottom of the Skylon. As long as the angle between any two cables is smaller than 180°, the position of the rod is well defined. While three cables are the minimum required for stability, additional cables can be attached to each node for aesthetic purposes or to build in additional stability. For example, Snelson's Needle Tower uses a repeated pattern built using nodes that are connected to 5 cables each.

Eleanor Heartney points out visual transparency as an important aesthetic quality of these structures. Korkmaz et al. has argued that lightweight tensegrity structures are suitable for adaptive architecture.

Applications 

Tensegrities saw increased application in architecture beginning in the 1960s, when Maciej Gintowt and Maciej Krasiński designed Spodek arena complex (in Katowice, Poland), as one of the first major structures to employ the principle of tensegrity. The roof uses an inclined surface held in check by a system of cables holding up its circumference. Tensegrity principles were also used in David Geiger's Seoul Olympic Gymnastics Arena (for the 1988 Summer Olympics), and the Georgia Dome (for the 1996 Summer Olympics). Tropicana Field, home of the Tampa Bay Rays major league baseball team, also has a dome roof supported by a large tensegrity structure.

On 4 October 2009, the Kurilpa Bridge opened across the Brisbane River in Queensland, Australia. A multiple-mast, cable-stay structure based on the principles of tensegrity, it is currently the world's largest tensegrity bridge.

Since the early 2000s, tensegrities have also attracted the interest of roboticists due to their potential to design lightweight and resilient robots. Numerous researches have investigated tensegrity rovers, bio-mimicking robots, and modular soft robots. The most famous tensegrity robot is the Super Ball Bot, a rover for space exploration using a 6-bar tensegrity structure, currently under developments at NASA Ames.

Biology 

Biotensegrity, a term coined by Dr. Stephen Levin, is an extended theoretical application of tensegrity principles to biological structures. Biological structures such as muscles, bones, fascia, ligaments and tendons, or rigid and elastic cell membranes, are made strong by the unison of tensioned and compressed parts. The musculoskeletal system consists of a continuous network of muscles and connective tissues, while the bones provide discontinuous compressive support, whilst the nervous system maintains tension in vivo through electrical stimulus.  Levin claims that the human spine, is also a tensegrity structure although there is no support for this theory from a structural perspective.

Donald E. Ingber has developed a theory of tensegrity to describe numerous phenomena observed in molecular biology. For instance, the expressed shapes of cells, whether it be their reactions to applied pressure, interactions with substrates, etc., all can be mathematically modeled by representing the cell's cytoskeleton as a tensegrity. Furthermore, geometric patterns found throughout nature (the helix of DNA, the geodesic dome of a volvox, Buckminsterfullerene, and more) may also be understood based on applying the principles of tensegrity to the spontaneous self-assembly of compounds, proteins, and even organs. This view is supported by how the tension-compression interactions of tensegrity minimize material needed to maintain stability and achieve structural resiliency, although the comparison with inert materials within a biological framework has no widely accepted premise within physiological science. Therefore, natural selection pressures would likely favor biological systems organized in a tensegrity manner.

As Ingber explains:

In embryology, Richard Gordon proposed that embryonic differentiation waves are propagated by an 'organelle of differentiation' where the cytoskeleton is assembled in a bistable tensegrity structure at the apical end of cells called the 'cell state splitter'.

Origins and art history 

The origins of tensegrity are controversial. Many traditional structures, such as skin-on-frame kayaks and shōji, use tension and compression elements in a similar fashion.

Russian artist Viatcheslav Koleichuk claimed that the idea of tensegrity was invented first by Kārlis Johansons (in Russian as German as Karl Ioganson) (lv), a Soviet avant-garde artist of Latvian descent, who contributed some works to the main exhibition of Russian constructivism in 1921. Koleichuk's claim was backed up by Maria Gough for one of the works at the 1921 constructivist exhibition. Snelson has acknowledged the constructivists as an influence for his work (query?). French engineer David Georges Emmerich has also noted how Kārlis Johansons's work (and industrial design ideas) seemed to foresee tensegrity concepts.

In 1948, artist Kenneth Snelson produced his innovative "X-Piece" after artistic explorations at Black Mountain College (where Buckminster Fuller was lecturing) and elsewhere. Some years later, the term "tensegrity" was coined by Fuller, who is best known for his geodesic domes. Throughout his career, Fuller had experimented with incorporating tensile components in his work, such as in the framing of his dymaxion houses.

Snelson's 1948 innovation spurred Fuller to immediately commission a mast from Snelson. In 1949, Fuller developed a tensegrity-icosahedron based on the technology, and he and his students quickly developed further structures and applied the technology to building domes. After a hiatus, Snelson also went on to produce a plethora of sculptures based on tensegrity concepts. His main body of work began in 1959 when a pivotal exhibition at the Museum of Modern Art took place. At the MOMA exhibition, Fuller had shown the mast and some of his other work.  At this exhibition, Snelson, after a discussion with Fuller and the exhibition organizers regarding credit for the mast, also displayed some work in a vitrine.

Snelson's best known piece is his 18-meter-high Needle Tower of 1968.

Stability

Tensegrity prisms 

The three-rod tensegrity structure (3-way prism) has the property that, for a given (common) length of compression member “rod” (there are three total) and a given (common) length of tension cable “tendon” (six total) connecting the rod ends together, there is a particular value for the (common) length of the tendon connecting the rod tops with the neighboring rod bottoms that causes the structure to hold a stable shape. For such a structure, it is straightforward to prove that the triangle formed by the rod tops and that formed by the rod bottoms are rotated with respect to each other by an angle of 5π/6 (radians). 

The stability (“prestressability”) of several 2-stage tensegrity structures are analyzed by Sultan, et al.

The T3-prism (also known as Triplex) can be obtained through form finding of a straight triangular prism. Its self-equilibrium state is given when the base triangles are in parallel planes separated by an angle of twist of π/6. The formula for its unique self-stress state is given by,

Here, the first three negative values correspond to the inner components in compression, while the rest correspond to the cables in tension.

Tensegrity icosahedra 

The tensegrity icosahedron, first studied by Snelson in 1949, has struts and tendons along the edges of a polyhedron called Jessen's icosahedron. It is a stable construction, albeit with infinitesimal mobility. To see this, consider a cube of side length , centered at the origin. Place a strut of length  in the plane of each cube face, such that each strut is parallel to one edge of the face and is centered on the face. Moreover, each strut should be parallel to the strut on the opposite face of the cube, but orthogonal to all other struts. The coordinates of the other strut ends (vertices) are obtained by permuting the coordinates, e.g.,  (rotational symmetry in the main diagonal of the cube).

The relation tells us there are two possible values for d: one realized by pushing the struts together, the other by pulling them apart. However both sets of coordinates lie along a continuous family of positions ranging from the cuboctahedron to the octahedron (as limit cases), which are linked by a helical contractive/expansive transformation. This kinematics of the cuboctahedron is the geometry of motion of the tensegrity icosahedron. It was first described by H. S. M. Coxeter and later called the "jitterbug transformation" by Buckminster Fuller.

Since the tensegrity icosahedron represents an extremal point of the above relation, it has infinitesimal mobility: a small change in the length s of the tendon (e.g. by stretching the tendons) results in a much larger change of the distance 2d of the struts.

Patents 

 , "Tensile-Integrity Structures," 13 November 1962, Buckminster Fuller.
 French Patent No. 1,377,290, "Construction de Reseaux Autotendants", 28 September 1964, David Georges Emmerich.
 French Patent No. 1,377,291, "Structures Linéaires Autotendants", 28 September 1964, David Georges Emmerich.
 , "Suspension Building" (also called aspension), 7 July 1964, Buckminster Fuller.
 , "Continuous Tension, Discontinuous Compression Structure," 16 February 1965, Kenneth Snelson.
 , "Non-symmetrical Tension-Integrity Structures," 18 February 1975, Buckminster Fuller.

Basic tensegrity structures

Tensegrity structures

See also 

 , giant sky-floating tensegrity spheres named by Buckminster Fuller
 
 
 
 
 
 
 
 
 , the geometry of the motion of the tensegrity icosahedron

Notes

References

Bibliography 

 
 
  Online
  A good overview on the scope of tensegrity from Fuller's point of view, and an interesting overview of early structures with careful attributions most of the time.
  2003 reprint . This is a good starting place for learning about the mathematics of tensegrity and building models.

Further reading 

 Edmondson, Amy (2007). "A Fuller Explanation", Emergent World LLC
 
 
  They present the remarkable result that any linear transformation of a tensegrity is also a tensegrity.
 
 
 
 
 Vilnay, Oren (1990). Cable Nets and Tensegric Shells: Analysis and Design Applications, New York: Ellis Horwood Ltd. 
 
 Wilken, Timothy (2001). Seeking the Gift Tensegrity, TrustMark

External links 

 Scientific Publications in the Field of Tensegrity by Swiss Federal Institute of Technology (EPFL), Applied Computing and Mechanics Laboratory (IMAC)
 Stephen Levin's Biotensegrity site Several papers on the tensegrity mechanics of biologic structures from viruses to vertebrates by an Orthopedic Surgeon.

Buckminster Fuller
Tensile architecture